The United States and Right-wing Dictatorships, 1965-1989 is a 2006 book by David F. Schmitz. In the United Kingdom it was published by Cambridge University Press.

References

2006 books
Cambridge University Press books
United States foreign policy